The Libyan Second Division is the second tier of the Libyan football championship, organised by Libyan Football Federation.

Winners list
2004-05 – Al Ahly (Benghazi)
2005-06 – Al Nasr
2006-07 – Al Wahda
2007-08 – Al Hilal
2008-09 – Najma
2009-10 – Darnes

 
Second level football leagues in Africa